The 2008 AT&T Cotton Bowl Classic was a college football bowl game played on January 1, 2008, at the Cotton Bowl in Dallas, Texas, USA. The Cotton Bowl Classic was part of the 2007 NCAA Division I FBS football season and one of 32 games in the 2007–08 bowl season. The bowl game featured the Arkansas Razorbacks from the SEC and the Missouri Tigers from the Big 12 and was televised in the United States on FOX.  Senior RB Tony Temple of Mizzou set a single game rushing record for the Cotton Bowl Classic with 281 yards and 4 touchdowns.  His 281 rushing yards put him in second place all time for total rushing yards in a bowl game.

Game invitation
The Arkansas Razorbacks and the Missouri Tigers accepted the Cotton Bowl Classic's invitation to play in the bowl game on January 1. This was the Arkansas Razorbacks' 11th appearance in the Cotton Bowl Classic (with a record of 3–6–1 in previous Cotton Bowl Classics) and the second appearance for the Missouri Tigers (0–1). Many Missouri fans felt insulted that the Tigers had been sent to the Cotton Bowl Classic instead of a BCS bowl after a stunning season that included a spot atop the AP College Football Rankings and a co-championship in the Big XII North. This feeling was amplified by the fact that the Kansas Jayhawks, Missouri's historical and then-conference rival, had been invited to the BCS Orange Bowl after being beaten by the Tigers at the annual Arrowhead Stadium Border Showdown in Kansas City, Missouri.

Pre-game buildup
 The 72nd Cotton Bowl Classic featured two Heisman Trophy candidates, Darren McFadden (playing for Arkansas) and Chase Daniel (playing for Missouri). McFadden finished second in the voting, while Daniel was fourth.
 Reggie Herring was the head coach at Arkansas for this game.  The defensive coordinator was the bridge between the departing Houston Nutt (who next  coached at Ole Miss) and the arriving Bobby Petrino (who resigned from the Atlanta Falcons of the NFL).
 This was the first of two sideline reporting assignments for Fox Sports' Jeanne Zelasko.  She also has a reporting assignment at the Orange Bowl, then she will leave the network to undergo treatments for thyroid cancer.

Game summary

See also
 Battle Line Rivalry

References

Cotton Bowl Classic
Arkansas Razorbacks football bowl games
Missouri Tigers football bowl games
Cotton Bowl Classic
January 2008 sports events in the United States
2008 in sports in Texas
2000s in Dallas
2008 in Texas